Biocompatibles International plc is a medical technology company in the field of drug-device combination products. It was acquired by BTG plc in 2010, which was, in turn, acquired by Boston Scientific in 2019.

Approved oncology products are supplied and marketed from facilities in Farnham, Surrey, UK and Oxford, Connecticut.

Products include drug-eluting bead products that are used in more than 35 countries for the treatment of primary liver cancer (HCC), liver metastases from colorectal cancer and other cancers. The company supplies and markets brachytherapy products (radiation-delivering seeds) that are used to treat prostate cancer.

Its UK research and development facilities are engaged in licensing and in new product development based on the company's core drug delivery technologies in the treatment of cancers.

Its Cellmed unit in Alzenau, Germany, is developing a drug-eluting bead product for the treatment of stroke based on proprietary stem cell technology. Cellmed is also developing a GLP-1 analogue for the treatment of diabetes and obesity partnered with AstraZeneca.

Biocompatibles has collaborative agreements with Bayer HealthCare Pharmaceuticals Inc., Medtronic Inc. and Merz Pharma.

History

In the 1970s Dennis Chapman (1927–1999) at London's Royal Free Hospital. Chapman and his colleagues were responsible for groundbreaking research in the area of biocompatibility – the ability of a material to interface within the body without provoking an adverse biological response. They identified phosphoryl-choline (PC), a substance present in the human cell membrane, as one of the primary natural materials responsible for biocompatibility.

In 1984 Chapman founded Biocompatibles, which patented PC technology to develop it for commercial healthcare applications. In 2002, the company expanded to a new field based upon embolisation therapy, a minimally invasive treatment for tumors or vascular malformations based upon compressible PVA embolic microspheres.

Biocompatibles has been publicly traded on the London Stock Exchange since 1995 (LSE:BII).

In 2010, the company was acquired by BTG plc for about 156 million pounds.

In 2019, its new parent company BTG was acquired by Boston Scientific for around US$4.2 billion.

The Technology

Biocompatibles has a patent portfolio defending three biomedical polymer systems.

 The NFil Technology licensed from the Biocure affiliate of Novartis' Ciba Vision subsidiary, which is used in the Drug-Eluting Beads programme;
 The CellMed alginate technology, CellBeads, which is required for the encapsulation of biological agents; and the PC technology that was the group's original platform;
 A variety of more product-specific drug delivery inventions for the delivery of both chemical and biological agents.

Pharmaceutical products

Research and products are centered on the controlled and accurate delivery of drugs to patients with certain forms of cancer or vascular problems.  Research is focused on the use of drug-eluting beads, which can be accurately delivered to the point of need. Once metabolized, these beads release the prescribed drug at a pre-determined rate.

References

Biotechnology companies of the United Kingdom
Multinational companies